The sharp-browed ctenotus (Ctenotus superciliaris)  is a species of skink found in the Northern Territory in Australia.

References

superciliaris
Reptiles described in 2014
Taxa named by Daniel L. Rabosky
Taxa named by Mark Norman Hutchinson
Taxa named by Steve Donnellan (scientist)
Taxa named by Amanda L. Talaba
Taxa named by Irby J. Lovette